Pylus or Pylos may refer to:

Places
 Pylos, a bay and town in Messenia, Greece
 Pylus (Elis), a city in ancient Elis, Greece
 Pylus (Triphylia), a town in ancient Elis, Greece
 Pylos-Nestor, a Greek municipality

Other
 Pylos Combat Agate, a sealstone from Pylos
 Pylus (mythology), a figure in Greek mythology
 Pylos (board game), a board game
 Pylus (beetle), a checkered beetle genus